Charles-Philbert de Couët de Lorry (27 August 1911 – 27 February 1981) was a French equestrian. He competed in two events at the 1952 Summer Olympics.

References

External links
 

1911 births
1981 deaths
French male equestrians
Olympic equestrians of France
Equestrians at the 1952 Summer Olympics
People from Pont-à-Mousson
Sportspeople from Meurthe-et-Moselle